Andrea Maria Jeremiah is an Indian actress, playback singer, and a musician, who works predominantly in Tamil and Malayalam language films. She made her acting debut in Tamil film Pachaikili Muthucharam (2007), and Malayalam debut with Annayum Rasoolum (2013).

She has appeared in many commercially successful films like Annayum Rasoolum (2013), Vishwaroopam (2013), Tadakha (2013), Endrendrum Punnagai (2013), Aranmanai (2014), Loham (2015), Thoppil Jopaan (2016), Taramani (2017), Aval (2017), Vada Chennai (2018) and  Aranmanai 3 (2021).

Early life
Andrea Jeremiah was born in an Anglo-Indian family at Arakkonam, Tamil Nadu.

Andrea's father is a lawyer at the Madras High Court. She has one younger sister who lives and works at Leuven, Belgium as a research assistant. Jeremiah was raised near Chennai and went to National Public School and graduated from Women's Christian College. She has said that she was quite a geek and wanted to be a psychiatrist until she completed her 12th board exams.

Andrea learned classical piano when she was eight. At age 10, she was a part of a Jackson Five-style troupe called Young Stars which formed the base of her early singing and music composing career. She was also a theatre artist in her college and appeared in several stage plays organised by The Madras Players and EVAM. She was the President of the Student Senate at Women's Christian College. She also organised a company, The Show Must Go On (TSMGO Productions), to promote live art and artistes. Andrea said that as a college student, she turned down every film offer she got as she had no intention of becoming a film actor.

Career

Acting
She began her theatre career with Girish Karnad's Nagamandala. She acted in new leo coffee advertisement with actor Shiva in 2006. She also acted in a serial which relayed In Podhigai channel. She has performed all over India. She played a brief role during the climax of Kanda Naal Mudhal (2005). After she rendered a song in Gautham Vasudev Menon's Vettaiyaadu Vilaiyaadu, he asked her to play as one of the lead female character in his next venture, Pachaikili Muthucharam. This film was a film adaptation of James Siegel's novel Derailed, with Andrea portraying Kalyani, a homemaker, whose husband engages in an affair and is blackmailed. Andrea was selected for the role after actresses Simran, Shobana and Tabu were approached.

She signed for Selvaraghavan's fantasy-adventure film Aayirathil Oruvan, which released in early 2010. In 2011, she agreed to play a minor supporting role in Venkat Prabhu's multi-starrer Mankatha, which was released in August 2011. In 2013, she made her debut in Malayalam cinema with Rajeev Ravi's romance film Annayum Rasoolum. She has rated this film as the best in her career. She played a role in Kamal Haasan's Vishwaroopam and reprised the role in its sequel, which released in 2018.

Andrea has completed filming for Puthiya Thiruppangal, in which she plays a journalist. In Endrendrum Punnagai, she played a model and she also acted in the Malayalam film London Bridge. And her next film as female lead is Aranmanai (2014), directed by Sundar C., It was a major commercial success and, as well as being a breakthrough film in her career.

She had signed on to director Ram's Taramani, which released in 2017.

In 2015, Andrea was cast alongside Mohanlal in Loham, directed by Ranjith. This was her third Malayalam film, and the first with Mohanlal.

In 2021, her first release was Master, which she played an Extended cameo role, then she appeared as lead in Arya's Aranmanai 3, directed by Sundar C. The film received mixed reviews but became a hit film.

She has also completed shootings for Tamil movies like Maaligai and Myskkin's Pisaasu 2 , and she is currently filming Kaa, in which she plays the lead role. She reportedly plays a wildlife photographer. She also completed her another Malayalam film Prakasham Parathunna Penkutty with Sudev Nair directed By R.Unni.

Singing
Andrea has stated that her focus was always on music, that she chose to be a professional singer and that acting happened by chance. In 2005, she ventured into playback singing in feature films. She has sung several popular songs for composers Harris Jayaraj, Yuvan Shankar Raja, Anirudh Ravichander, Thaman, Devi Sri Prasad and G. V. Prakash Kumar and has also received nominations at Filmfare and Vijay Awards for a few of them. She considers the song "Maalai Neram" as the most challenging she has sung.

Composing
Apart from singing under other composers' direction, Andrea also produces her own music. She composed, wrote and sang a single, "Soul of Taramani", as a promo for her Tamil romantic-drama Taramani. She has composed several music themes, songs and albums.

Filmography

As Dubbing Artist

Awards & nominations

Television

Discography

See also

List of Indian actresses
List of Indian playback singers

References

External links

 
 
 
 

Actresses in Tamil cinema
Actresses from Chennai
Living people
Tamil playback singers
Anglo-Indian people
Actresses of European descent in Indian films
Actresses in Malayalam cinema
Actresses in Telugu cinema
Indian voice actresses
Actresses in Hindi cinema
21st-century Indian actresses
Indian film actresses
Women's Christian College, Chennai alumni
Singers from Chennai
21st-century Indian singers
Telugu playback singers
Indian folk-pop singers
Indian women pop singers
Women musicians from Tamil Nadu
21st-century Indian women singers
Year of birth missing (living people)